Palau language may refer to:

Palauan language
the Palau dialect of Lave language
Languages of Palau